Eva Šuranová (née Kucman, 24 April 1946 in Ózd, Hungary − 31 December 2016) was a Czechoslovak athlete, who competed mainly in the long jump.

Šuranová competed for Czechoslovakia in the 1972 Summer Olympics held in Munich, Germany in the long jump, where she won the bronze medal.

References

External links
 
 
 
 
 

1946 births
2016 deaths
Czech female long jumpers
Slovak female long jumpers
Olympic athletes of Czechoslovakia
Olympic bronze medalists for Czechoslovakia
Athletes (track and field) at the 1972 Summer Olympics
Athletes (track and field) at the 1976 Summer Olympics
European Athletics Championships medalists
Medalists at the 1972 Summer Olympics
Olympic bronze medalists in athletics (track and field)
People from Borsod-Abaúj-Zemplén County